is a passenger railway station  located in the city of Takarazuka, Hyōgo Prefecture, Japan. It is operated by the West Japan Railway Company (JR West).

Lines

Station layout
The station consists of two opposed elevated side platforms. The southern half of the platform is on a bridge (2nd Mukogawa Bridge), and the northern half is in a tunnel (1st Takedao Tunnel). Also, the Osaka side of the bridge is Nishinomiya, Hyōgo city. Although it is an elevated station, it has no elevators or escalators, so it is difficult for users such as wheelchairs. The station is unattended.

Platforms

Adjacent stations

History
Takedao Sation opened on 25 January 1899, as a station of Hankaku Railway, which was nationalized in 1907. With the privatization of the Japan National Railways (JNR) on 1 April 1987, the station came under the aegis of the West Japan Railway Company.

Station numbering was introduced in March 2018 with Takedao being assigned station number JR-G59.

Passenger statistics
In fiscal 2016, the station was used by an average of 567 passengers daily

Surrounding area
 Takedao Onsen
 Satoyama Park

See also
List of railway stations in Japan

References

External links 

 Takedao Station from JR-Odekake.net 

Railway stations in Hyōgo Prefecture
Railway stations in Japan opened in 1899
Takarazuka, Hyōgo